Players and pairs who neither have high enough rankings nor receive wild cards may participate in a qualifying tournament held one week before the annual Wimbledon Tennis Championships.

Qualifiers

  Iwona Kuczyńska
  Natalia Medvedeva
  Laura Golarsa
  Gisele Miró
  Michelle Jaggard
  Karen Schimper
  Belinda Cordwell
  Kumiko Okamoto

Lucky loser
  Anna-Maria Fernandez

Qualifying draw

First qualifier

Second qualifier

Third qualifier

Fourth qualifier

Fifth qualifier

Sixth qualifier

Seventh qualifier

Eighth qualifier

External links

1987 Wimbledon Championships on WTAtennis.com
1987 Wimbledon Championships – Women's draws and results at the International Tennis Federation

Women's Singles Qualifying
Wimbledon Championship by year – Women's singles qualifying
Wimbledon Championships